Çankaya Futbol Kulübü, formerly Ankara Adliyespor, is a football club located in Ankara, Turkey. The team currently competes in the TFF Third League.

The club was promoted to the TFF Third League after 2012–13 season.

League participations 
TFF Third League: 2013–
Amateur League: 1993–2013

Stadium 
Currently the team plays at the 4,200 capacity Ankara Ostim Stadyumu.

Current squad

References

External links 
Official website
Çankaya FK on TFF.org

TFF Third League clubs
Football clubs in Turkey
Association football clubs established in 1993
1993 establishments in Turkey
Football clubs in Ankara